On 25 March 1986, an Antonov An-32 twin engine turboprop transport aircraft of the Indian Air Force disappeared while flying over the Arabian Sea. The aircraft was on a three-aircraft ferry flight from the Soviet Union en route to India from Muscat-Seeb Airport, Oman, to Jamnagar, Gujarat, in India. There were 7 people on board. The last contact with the aircraft was 1 hour and 18 minutes after takeoff.

See also
 List of missing aircraft
 2016 Indian Air Force An-32 disappearance
 2019 Indian Air Force An-32 crash

References

Missing aircraft
Accidents and incidents involving the Antonov An-32
Aviation accidents and incidents in 1986
Aviation accidents and incidents in India
1986 in India
Accidents and incidents involving military aircraft